In enzymology, an undecaprenyl-diphosphatase is an enzyme that catalyzes the chemical reaction

undecaprenyl diphosphate + H2O  undecaprenyl phosphate + phosphate

Thus, the two substrates of this enzyme are undecaprenyl diphosphate and H2O, whereas its two products are undecaprenyl phosphate and phosphate. The enzymatic activity is enhanced by divalent cations, particularly Ca2+.

In many bacteria, this enzyme is a membrane protein that participates in peptidoglycan biosynthesis. The enzyme has been implicated in conferring resistance to the antibiotic bacitracin.

Nomenclature 

This enzyme belongs to the family of hydrolases, specifically those acting on acid anhydrides in phosphorus-containing anhydrides.  The systematic name of this enzyme class is undecaprenyl-diphosphate phosphohydrolase. Other names in common use include Undecaprenyl-pyrophosphate phosphatase (Uppp), UPP phosphatase, BacA, C55-isoprenyl diphosphatase, C55-isoprenyl pyrophosphatase, and isoprenyl pyrophosphatase.

Note: The enzyme Uppp/BacA (EC 3.6.1.27) has occasionally been incorrectly termed an "undecaprenol kinase". However, that name should be reserved for a distinct enzyme (EC 2.7.1.66), which catalyses the addition of a phosphate group from ATP to undecaprenol (C55-isoprenyl alcohol).

Structure 
X-ray crystal structures of the membrane-form of the enzyme from E. coli are available (PDB IDs: 5OON, 6CB2).

References

Further reading 

 

EC 3.6.1
Enzymes of unknown structure